Baghin is a town in the Méguet Department of Ganzourgou Province in central Burkina Faso. The town had a population of 1,112.

References

Populated places in the Plateau-Central Region
Ganzourgou Province